The Krukut River is a river flowing in Jakarta originating in Bogor Regency. In the past the river was clean and one of the tourist attractions during the Dutch East Indies administration, but due to denser housing on the banks and lack of maintenance, the water turned dark and filled with trash, causing routine flooding in rainy seasons.

Etymology 
"Krukut" is a name of a neighborhood in the district of Taman Sari, West Jakarta, located between two rivers: Ci Liwung and Cideng (later known as "Kali Krukut"). Old tales give multiple versions of the etymology of the name. It may originate from the word "krokot" in Betawi language, denoting a "very frugal" lifestyle, which was applied to a community of Arab people living in the area, as "Arab Krukut", until this day. Another version refers to the Dutch word "kerkhof" (meaning "cemetery"), which was transliterated in Betawi tongue as "Krukut", which points to many cemeteries for local Betawi people around this area in the past.

History
The Krukut river has the upstream at Situ Citayam, Depok, West Java, and today it ends near Karet area, merging into "Banjir Kanal Barat", with a total length of 84.4 kilometer, of which about 30 kilometer is the main river. The downstream of the Krukut river has caused severe flooding in Jakarta since 1890. The intermittent widening, digging and straightening of the flow in the decades managed to partially tame some parts. However, in August 2016, the luxurious and also iconic area of South Jakarta, Kemang, was inundated by the overflow of Krukut, after some protecting walls were damaged due to unprecedented high discharge. Other incidents were regularly reported from Kebalen to Pondok Labu in South Jakarta.

In early 1970s, the width of Krukut was about 25 meter, and deeper than normal human height. Its flow was a source of irrigation for rice fields and fish farming. No housing was allowed to built as this was a designated water flow area. However, since then many buildings were illegally erected along the banks, and the people threws household trash in the river, that even after the cleaning in 2017, the width of Krukut became as narrow as 1.5 meter in some points (according to Iskandar, the head of Balai Besar Wilayah Sungai Ciliwung-Cisadane/BBWSCC).

Actually, a small stream of Krukut reappears about 300 meter from the confluence with Banjir Kanal Barat, at the administrative village of Kebon Melati, with the width of 3 meter, known locally as "Old Krukut" ("Krukut Lama") or "Lower Krukut" ("Krukut Bawah"). This stream meanders 31.4 kilometer before merging into Kali Pakin at Krukut area, West Jakarta, then into "Kali Besar" and finally reaching the Pluit Dam at Pintu Air Pasar Ikan, indirectly discharged into Jakarta Bay.

Hydrology
The average daily rainfall is 129 mm, with the peak discharge at 135 m³.

Geography
The river flows in the northwest area of Java with predominantly tropical rainforest climate (designated as Af in the Köppen-Geiger climate classification). The annual average temperature in the area is 27 °C. The warmest month is March, when the average temperature is around 30 °C, and the coldest is May, at 26 °C. The average annual rainfall is 3674 mm. The wettest month is December, with an average of 456 mm rainfall, and the driest is September, with 87 mm rainfall.

Normalisation 
The normalisation of the Krukut river started in the era of Governor Ali Sadikin, 1966-1977, to include the straightening of the flow, cutting problematic river bends and removing small sedimentation islands in the stream. This project was part of flood handling strategy, involving the removal of some 8,000 people from the housing on the river banks of Kali Krukut Cideng canal (Kompas, 21 February 1971).

In 2010, the government ordered the digging of the river, removing 1000 cubic meter of mud in a stretch of 1.1 km. This was accompanied by cleaning the blocked drains and educating local people about sanitary and river maintenance. The government of Jakarta also vowed to evict luxury houses that illegally occupied the designated open green space along the Krukut river banks, which was the caused of heavy flood in Kemang and its surrounding in August 2016. It was reported that the width of the Krukut river has decreased from 20 meter to only 4-5 meter due to the illegal buildings.

Until 2017, the river has been normalised by BBWSCC from Rengas Bridge to Jalan Kebalen V in Kuningan.

See also
 List of rivers of Java
 List of rivers of Jakarta

References

Rivers of Jakarta
Rivers of Indonesia